The Imperial German Navy  Zeppelin LZ 24 (L 3) was a M-class World War I zeppelin.

Operational history

After 24 reconnaissance missions over the North Sea, L 3 participated in the first raid on England on 19 January 1915. On 17 February 1915 it was abandoned after a forced landing in Denmark, caused by engine failure compounded by strong headwinds and insufficient fuel. The wind was so strong it blew the airship, now unmanned but with engines still running, out to sea.

Specifications (LZ 24 / M2-class zeppelin)

See also

List of Zeppelins
Zeppelin LZ 3

Bibliography 
Notes

'References
 
 - Total pages: 880 
 - Total pages: 376  

Airships of Germany
Hydrogen airships
Zeppelins
Aviation accidents and incidents in 1915
Accidents and incidents involving balloons and airships